Toofan may refer to:

Toofan (1989 film), Indian Hindi-language film directed by Ketan Desai starring Amitabh Bachchan  
Toofan (2002 film), Pakistani Urdu-language film directed by Parvez Rana
Thoofan, also known as Zanjeer in Hindi, Indian Telugu-language film directed by Apoorva Lakhia starring Ram Charan
Toofaan, 2021 Indian Hindi-language film
Toofan Harirod F.C., Afghan football club
 Toofan (MRAP), an Iranian armored vehicle